The 2008–09 Persian Gulf Cup (also known as Iran Pro League) was the 26th season of Iran's Football League and eighth as Iran Pro League since its establishment in 2001. Persepolis were the defending champions. The season featured 15 teams from the 2007–08 Persian Gulf Cup and two new teams promoted from the 2007–08 Azadegan League: Payam Mashhad as champions and Foolad. Damash replaced Pegah. The league started on 4 August 2008 and ended on 26 April 2009. Esteghlal won the Pro League title for the second time in their history (total seventh Iranian title).

Teams

In October 2008 Pegah Gilan terminated their sports activities due to financial problems. Damash Iranian (Damash Mineral Water Company) owned by Amir Abedini took over their license. New club named Damash Gilan.

Below is the list of coaches who left their teams after the start of the season.

League standings

Results table

Last updated April 26, 2009

Player statistics

Top scorers

Last updated: 11 April 2009Source: Iplstats.com

Top assists

Last updated: 11 April 2009Source: Iplstats.com

Cards

Matches played

33
  Morteza Ebrahimi (Mes)
  Vahid Taleblou (Esteghlal)

Sponsorship
 Referee's Sponsor: GERAD
 Referee's Supplier: Merooj

Team Shirt manufacturers

Attendances

Average home attendances

Highest attendances

Notes:Updated to games played on 26 April 2009. Source: iplstats.com

See also
 2008–09 Azadegan League
 2008–09 Iran Football's 2nd Division
 2008–09 Iran Football's 3rd Division
 2008–09 Hazfi Cup
 Iranian Super Cup
 2008–09 Iranian Futsal Super League

References

 Iran Premier League Statistics
 Persian League
 Soccerway
 Bazikonan

Iran Pro League seasons
Iran
1